Eleutherodactylus andrewsi is a species of frog in the family Eleutherodactylidae endemic to Jamaica. Its natural habitats are subtropical or tropical moist lowland forest and subtropical or tropical moist montane forest. It is threatened by habitat loss.

References

andrewsi
Endemic fauna of Jamaica
Amphibians of Jamaica
Amphibians described in 1937
Taxonomy articles created by Polbot